Mackworth is a suburb and electoral ward of the city of Derby, England. Is it located on the north-west of the city near to Markeaton Park and the suburb of Mickleover. It is also known as Mackworth Estate, to distinguish it from the nearby Mackworth village. The Mackworth ward also covers the New Zealand area as well as Mackworth itself.

History
Development as a housing estate began in the 1930s, with construction on Brackensdale Avenue, Greenland Avenue, Lilac Avenue and Laburnum Grove. Most of the area was developed during the 1950s (the first house completed in 1953) and it was one of the largest housing estates to be built in the city. Further development followed on the northern fringes of the estate, with sporadic small building projects over the years that followed. Mackworth's most noticeable landmark is a large water tower owned by Severn Trent and can be seen from much of the estate. The estate was home to Derby College, Prince Charles Avenue Campus.  These buildings were formerly Mackworth Secondary School and Parkfields Cedars Grammar School for Girls, subsequently combined to form Parkfields Comprehensive School, which closed in the 1980s, the building then being turned over to the local tertiary college. Once education on the site ceased further housing was built in the 2010s.

Today the majority of homes on the estate are now owner occupied, though there is still a significant stock of social housing available.  Housing density is very low, there are plentiful areas of green open space, and there is very little terraced/apartment housing. There are a number of small bungalows originally designed for older residents, some on the same site as an old people's home along with residential provision for people with vision impairment (The Lois Ellis Home for the Blind). Following closure of local authority provision, these residential facilities were demolished and subsequently an Extra Care Facility was built on the site. Amenities and facilities for local residents include shops, dentist, doctors, churches etc. A branch of the city library opened in late March 2010.

During development in the 1950s all but one (the exception being the main artery of the Estate, Prince Charles Avenue) of the roads in Mackworth were named after places in London, for example Knightsbridge, Wembley Gardens, Bayswater Close and Mornington Crescent. This theme was continued in the housing constructed in the 2010s. The 1950s estate was designed with curved roads to discourage use as short-cuts or 'ratruns'.

Demographics
According to the 2011 Census, the Mackworth ward had a population of 14,180, representing an 8.74% increase on the 2001 Census figure of 13,040.

See also
Listed buildings in Derby (Mackworth Ward)
St Barnabas' Church, Mackworth, Derby

References

External links
BBC community website

Areas of Derby
Wards of Derby